Circumstantial Evidence is the ninth album by American R&B group Shalamar, produced by L.A. Reid, Babyface, Jerry Peters, and Klymaxx founding member Bernadette Cooper.  Released in 1987 on the SOLAR label.  The line-up on this album is Delisa Davis, Micki Free and Sydney Justin, the latter having replaced Howard Hewett, who had left the group in 1986 to pursue a solo career.

Circumstantial Evidence peaked at number 29 on the R&B chart but failed to register on the Billboard chart.

Track listing

Personnel
Micki Free - vocals, lead guitar, rhythm guitar
Sydney Justin - vocals, keyboards
Delisa Davis - vocals, keyboards
Babyface - keyboards, rhythm guitar, backing vocals
Kayo - bass, backing vocals
L.A. - drums (all tracks, except "Female" and "Worth Waitin' For")
Bernadette Cooper - bass, drums, keyboards ("Female"); rap ("Imaginary Love")
Jerry Peters - bass, keyboards, drums ("Worth Waitin' For")
Gerald Albright - saxophone ("Worth Waitin' For")
Michael Hightower - drums, keyboards, programming ("Female")
"Roman" Jordan - keyboards ("Female")
Larry Leeds - programming ("Female")
Eddie M - saxophone ("Playthang")
Craig Cooper - guitar, drums, synthesizer ("Worth Waitin' For")
Hami Dair - guitar ("Imaginary Love")
Etienne - keyboards, bass ("Imaginary Love")
Pebbles - backing vocals
Melvin Edmonds - backing vocals
Debra Hurd - backing vocals
Dee Bristol - backing vocals

Singles

References

External links
 Shalamar-Circumstantial-Evidence at Discogs

Shalamar albums
1987 albums
SOLAR Records albums
Albums produced by Jerry Peters